Rahadian is an Indonesian surname. Notable people with the surname include:

 Reza Rahadian (born 1987), Iranian-Indonesian-Maluku actor
 Yogi Rahadian (born 1995), Indonesian footballer

Indonesian-language surnames